is a crossover rhythm game developed by Sega for the PlayStation Vita. It was released in Japan on December 17, 2015.

The game uses the same engine and gameplay as the Hatsune Miku: Project DIVA series of rhythm games, and features characters and songs from the following Japanese anime series: YuruYuri, Nyaruko: Crawling with Love, Vividred Operation, Kin-iro Mosaic, Arpeggio of Blue Steel, Tesagure! Bukatsu-mono, Wake Up, Girls!, Go! Go! 575, No-Rin, Engaged to the Unidentified and Is the Order a Rabbit?.

Song List 
There are a total of 22 songs from 11 different anime series. Each of the 22 songs features a 3D PV with 3D models of the anime characters from the respective series.

References

External links
 

2015 video games
Japan-exclusive video games
Music video games
PlayStation Vita games
PlayStation Vita-only games
Sega video games
Video games featuring female protagonists
Video games developed in Japan

Crossover video games